The Majestueux was a 110-gun ship of the line of the French Navy, of the Terrible class.

She was renamed Républicain in 1797. In 1807, she was decommissioned and used as a transport.

References
 Dictionnaire de la flotte de guerre française, Jean-Michel Roche

Ships of the line of the French Navy
Ships built in France
Terrible-class ships of the line
1780 ships